Peter Larkin Duren (30 April 1935 – July 10, 2020) was an American mathematician. He specialized in mathematical analysis and was known for the monographs and textbooks he has written.

Academic Career 
Duren received in 1956 his bachelor's degree from Harvard University and in 1960 his PhD from MIT under Gian-Carlo Rota with thesis Spectral theory of a class of non-self-adjoint infinite matrix operators. As a postdoc he was an instructor at Stanford University. At the University of Michigan, he became in 1962 an assistant professor, in 1966 an associate professor, in 1969 a professor, and in 2010 a professor emeritus.

Duren was in 1968/69 at the Institute for Advanced Study, in 1975 a visiting professor at the Technion in Haifa, in 1964/65 a visiting scientist at Imperial College and the University of Paris-Sud in Orsay, in 1982 a visiting professor at the University of Maryland and in 1982/83 at the Mittag-Leffler Institute, the University of Paris-Sud and at the ETH Zürich. In 1989 he was a visiting scientist at Stanford University, in 1993 at the University of Hawaii and in 1996 at the Norwegian Institute of Technology in Trondheim. He has also been a visiting scientist in Halle, at the Max-Planck Institute in Leipzig, at the University of Witwatersrand, in Santiago de Chile, at the Autonomous University of Madrid, at Bar-Ilan University and the Academia Sinica in Beijing.

In 1976/77 he was chief editor of the Michigan Mathematical Journal. He was a co-editor of the American Mathematical Monthly and a festschrift for Frederick Gehring.

Duren's research and expository writing deals with function theory and functional analysis, including Hardy spaces, schlicht functions, harmonic analysis, geometric function theory, potential theory, and special functions.

Awards 
From 1964 to 1966, Duren was a Sloan Fellow. In 2012, he became a Fellow of the American Mathematical Society.

Selected works
Invitation to classical analysis, American Mathematical Society 2012
Harmonic maps in the plane, Cambridge University Press 2004
with Alexander Schuster: Bergman Spaces, American Mathematical Society 2004
as editor with Richard A. Askey and Uta C. Merzbach: A century of mathematics in America, 3 vols., American Mathematical Society 1988 (Centenary of the AMS)
Univalent Functions, Grundlehren der mathematischen Wissenschaften, Springer Verlag 1983
Theory of -Spaces, Academic Press 1970, Dover 2000

References

External links
Homepage

1935 births
20th-century American mathematicians
21st-century American mathematicians
Fellows of the American Mathematical Society
Harvard University alumni
Massachusetts Institute of Technology alumni
University of Michigan faculty
Living people